"Dirty Old Man" is a single performed by American country music artist George Hamilton IV, and written by Canadian songwriter Bob Ruzicka. Released in April 1973, it was a single from Hamilton's album Out West Country. The song reached No. 1 on the RPM Country Tracks chart in Canada on June 2, 1973. A version by Valdy reached No. 38 in Canada in 1978.

The song was a Juno Award nominee for Country Single of the Year at the Juno Awards of 1974.

Chart performance

References

1973 singles
George Hamilton IV songs
1983 songs